Sérgio Daniel Duarte (born 11 January 1993 in Long Branch, New Jersey) is a Portuguese-American footballer who plays for Pevidém as a midfielder.

He is eligible to represent Portugal or the USA internationally but has stated that he would prefer to play for the United States.

References

External links

1993 births
Living people
Portuguese footballers
Association football midfielders
C.D. Nacional players
Primeira Liga players
Académico de Viseu F.C. players
SC Mirandela players
Lusitano FCV players
Clube Oriental de Lisboa players
Liga Portugal 2 players
S.C. Salgueiros players
U.D. Leiria players
F.C. Felgueiras 1932 players
Merelinense F.C. players
Pevidém S.C. players